Politically Re-Active is a political comedy podcast hosted by comedians W. Kamau Bell and Hari Kondabolu. The left-leaning show, organized around guest interviews, launched in June 2016 and initially focused on the 2016 United States presidential election, but continued through October 2017. After a hiatus, it resumed in October 2020.

History
Bell and Kondabolu previously worked together on Totally Biased with W. Kamau Bell, with Bell hosting and Kondabolu serving as writer and correspondent. The show grew out of conversations the two hosts were having by telephone and backstage at shows over the course of their careers as stand-up comedians. 

The first two seasons of Politically Re-Active were produced by First Look Media in collaboration with Slate's podcasting division, Panoply. The show was First Look Media's first podcast. The third season was produced by Topic Studios and WarnerMedia Podcast Network.

Schedule
The podcast debuted in June 2016. Early episodes focused on the U.S. presidential campaign of 2016, with weekly episodes from June through the election in November. Politically Re-Active aired two post-election episodes in November 2016, then went on hiatus. Season 2 began on March 15, 2017, and ended on October 5, 2017. The show's third season debuted on October 5, 2020.

Format
The show consists of interviews and political comedy. Bell and Kondabolu "host (typically left-leaning) guests each week to try to understand the different ideologies that are shaping this election." Wired described Politically Reactive as "mostly reasonable discussions with guests." Topics of discussion have included dog-whistling, private prisons, presidential debates and the Olympics. Interviews are edited to insert occasional explanations from Bell and Kondabolu (introduced by Kondabolu saying, "Hold up, wait a minute!") to give additional context.

Reception
ColorLines called it a "hilarious new politics podcast" and The Guardian said of the debut, "Bell and Kondabolu are two of the sharpest, funniest political minds around, and based on the first episode, Politically Re-Active will be a great addition to the podcast roster." In July The A.V. Club said the series had "start[ed] off strong," particularly praising the interview with Kathleen Hanna: "an altogether enjoyable episode that's also a nice primer on both feminism and mansplaining. If the first three episodes are any indication, Bell and Kondabolu are going to be a podcasting force to be reckoned with." AlterNet called it "a seriously great podcast series...easily one of the most binge-worthy things I've listened to in recent memory, and already a runaway hit." 

In the first six episodes, Politically Re-Active made iTunes' top 15 chart.

Episodes

Season 1

Season 2

Season 3

See also 

 Political podcast

References

External links
 

Political podcasts
Comedy and humor podcasts
2016 podcast debuts
Political mass media in the United States
Megaphone (podcasting)
American podcasts
Liberal podcasts